Stewart Marshall "Steve" Llewellyn (29 February 1924 – 10 December 2002) was a Welsh rugby union and professional rugby league footballer who played in the 1940s and 1950s.

Llewellyn was born in Abertyleri, Blaenau Gwent on 29 February 1924. He joined the Welsh Guards in 1943 and served in Italy during the Second World War. Having been playing rugby union for his hometown of Abertillery since 1945, Llewellyn signed with English rugby league club St Helens in January 1948.

During the 1952–53 Northern Rugby Football League season Llewellyn played , i.e. number 2, in St. Helens' 5–22 defeat by Leigh in the 1952 Lancashire Cup Final at Station Road, Swinton on Saturday 29 November 1952. During the 1952–53 Northern Rugby Football League season Llewellyn played , i.e. number 2, and scored a try in St. Helens' 10–15 defeat by Huddersfield in the 1953 Challenge Cup Final at Wembley Stadium, London on Saturday 25 April 1953. During the 1953–54 Northern Rugby Football League season, he played  in the 16–8 victory over Wigan in the 1953 Lancashire Cup Final at Station Road, Swinton on Saturday 24 October 1953. LLewellyn equalled the St. Helens' club record for most tries in a match twice by scoring six against Castleford on 3 March 1956, and again against Liverpool City on 20 August 1956. During the 1956–57 Northern Rugby Football League season, he and played  in the 3–10 defeat by Oldham in the 1956 Lancashire Cup Final at Central Park, Wigan on Saturday 20 October 1956.

Llewellyn was one of less than twenty Welshmen to have scored more than 200-tries in their rugby league career. Only three players (Tom van Vollenhoven, Les Jones and Alf Ellaby) have scored more than his 240 tries for the St Helens club. In retirement, he stayed in St. Helen's, working as an English language and PE teacher, and later became deputy head at two local secondary schools. Llewellyn died in St Helens, Merseyside, in 2002.

References

External links
Profile at saints.org.uk
Obituary: Steve Llewellyn, by Dave Hadfield – The Independent (London),  Dec 23, 2002
(archived by web.archive.org) Saints slaughter Kangaroos

1924 births
2002 deaths
Abertillery RFC players
Army rugby union players
British Army personnel of World War II
Other Nationalities rugby league team players
Rugby league players from Abertillery
Rugby league wingers
Rugby union players from Abertillery
St Helens R.F.C. players
Wales national rugby league team players
Welsh Guards soldiers
Welsh rugby league players
Welsh rugby union players